Holýšov is a town in Plzeň-South District in the Plzeň Region of the Czech Republic. It has about 5,100 inhabitants.

Administrative parts

The village of Dolní Kamenice is an administrative part of Holýšov.

Geography
It lies mostly in the Švihov Highlands, the western part of the municipal territory lies in the Plasy Uplands. The town is situated on the right bank of the Radbuza River.

History
The first written mention of Holýšov is in a deed of Pope Gregory X from 1273. Transformation from a small village to a town began after 1897, when one of the biggest glassworks in Austria-Hungary were founded and the population significantly increased. The glassworks went bankrupt due to the world crisis in the 1930s.

During World War II, Holýšov was occupied by Germany. The glassworks building was rebuilt to an ammunition factory. In 1944, two subcamps of the Flossenbürg concentration camp were founded: one for French, Polish, Russian and Jewish women, and one for Polish, Jewish, Czech and Russian men. The men's subcamp was presumably dissolved in January 1945, whereas the women's subcamp was liberated by Polish partisans in May 1945. After the German occupation, the town was restored to Czechoslovakia.

In 1960, Holýšov obtained the town status. From 1 January 2021, Holýšov is no longer a part of Domažlice District and belongs to Plzeň-South District.

Demographics

Transport

Holýšov is located on the international railway line Prague–Plzeň–Munich.

Sights

The oldest building in Holýšov is the Church of Saints Peter and Paul. It was first mentioned in 1352 and in 1384, it was referred to as a parish church. During the Thirty Years' War, it was partly demolished.

Exposition dedicated to the history of Holýšov and the history of World War II in Holýšov are in the town museum named Dům dějin Holýšovska ("House of history of the Holýšov region").

Twin towns – sister cities

Holýšov is twinned with:
 Kümmersbruck, Germany
 Port, Switzerland

References

External links

Cities and towns in the Czech Republic
Populated places in Plzeň-South District